Kendua Joyhari Spry Government High School is a public secondary school in Kendua, Netrakona District, Bangladesh.

History

In 1862, the school was started as "Middle Vernacular School" in collaboration with Mr. Beabré, the then District Magistrate of Mymensingh district. Then the school was taught in English. In 1892, "Middle Vernacular School" was recognized as "Middle English School" The lower secondary school in the English language was established. As a Middle English School, from 1892 to 1912, I got many good fame in Mymensingh district. Among the subjects were Bengali, English, Mathematics, History, Geography, Islam and Hinduism. Then the school got its name as "Kandura M.E. School". Kandura M.E. in 1844 In order to upgrade the school to high English school, Mr. Shree Ranada Kumar Chowdhury, the landlord of four and a half anne, living in Dhaka, took the initiative of "Shri Akshay Kumar Gupta" in charge of the then officer-in-charge of Kendua. District Magistrate took part in raising money for Kendua High School in the village "Mr. Speari-Sastri" village. In recognition of his contribution in promoting high school in 1914, the Kandua residents of the district of Mymensingh, the then District Magistrate, Mr. H.E. Spray IcS Who decided to join the school name.

During the abolition of British imperialism, during the non-cooperation movement of non-cooperation between India and India, anti-English protesters became financially inadequate. In order to overcome the financial deterioration of the school, application for assistance and assistance is being made inside and outside the school area. In the year 1926, according to the letter submitted by Professor "Mahim Chandra Chowdhury" of "Pala Chowdhury" of Chitholia village, Chitolia village received a grant of Tk 4000 based on the assurance of receiving Tk 4000 in a session of the school committee held on 06-1-1926, after getting the name of the school. The name of the school with the name of a flock is "Kendua spray-ins Tutition "instead of" Kandua-Jayehri-Spray Institution ".

Since 1961, there is a chance for science education in Kendua High School. As the school is under the bilateral education plan, significant government grants are received for scientific equipment, furniture and school-house donations. As the school is involved in government's multi-purpose development plan in 1966, the scope of study of humanities, science and agricultural science and commercial branches has improved. Since 2011, the girls have the opportunity to study as well as boys in schools. In that year 30 girls were enrolled in class 6. Currently, there are about 100 girls studying in the school.

Results
In 1984, two students secured 2nd and 8th position in the field of Agricultural Education in Dhaka Education Board; Apart from this, two more students got merit list in Agriculture Branch in 1972 and 1981.

SSC 
The results of the SSC examination of the school from 2011 to 017 are as follows:

JSC 
The results of the JSC examination from 2015 to 2016 are as follows:

References

Schools in Bangladesh